Bpost (stylised bpost) also known as the Belgian Post Group, is the Belgian company responsible for the delivery of national and international mail. The Belgian Post Group is one of the largest civilian employers in Belgium. It provides a range of postal, courier, direct marketing, banking, insurance, and electronic services in a highly competitive European market. The headquarters are located in Brussels at the Muntcenter (Bisschopsstraat).

Before 2010, it was known as De Post in Dutch and La Poste in French, meaning "the Post" in each case in English.

Ownership 

By Royal Decree of 17 March 2000, The Post cast off its status of autonomous public enterprise to adopt the status of a public limited liability company. Its public service missions are all described that it concluded with the Belgian State.

In January 2006, Post Danmark and CVC Capital Partners signed an agreement with the Belgian Government on the acquisition of 50% minus one share in the Belgian Post for €300 million. Post Danmark had been selected by the Belgian Government a partner because it would assist bpost in modernizing the company. The Belgian Government, bpost, Post Danmark and CVC have prepared a joint plan for developing the Belgian Post over the coming years. The target is for bpost to be among the leading and most efficient postal services in Europe.

Acquisitions

Certipost is a Belgian electronic communications subsidiary of bpost based in Aalst founded in 2002. They produce solutions to issues with electronic document exchange and archiving including digital certificate and electronic identity cards.

In October 2017, bpost acquired American e-commerce company Radial, Inc. for US$820 million.

References

External links
 
 

Communications in Belgium
Companies based in Brussels
Companies listed on Euronext Brussels
Private equity portfolio companies
CVC Capital Partners companies
Belg
Postal system of Belgium